Ukraine and Russia have had hostile relations since 2014 Russian occupation of Ukrainian peninsula of Crimea. In February 2022, a major escalation happened after the Russian Federation launched a full-scale invasion of Ukraine. This article concerns influence of Russo-Ukrainian conflict on Croats and Republic of Croatia.

Political influence 

The Croatian political scene was divided in regard to Russia's invasion of Ukraine. Republic of Croatia's Government led by prime minister Andrej Plenković expressed its full support to Ukraine, which Plenković himself emphasized several times in his statements. In May 2022, Plenković visited Ukrainian president Volodymyr Zelenskyy in Kyiv. On 25 February 2022, the Croatian Parliament adopted the Declaration on Ukraine, with 133 votes in favour and one vote abstaining. The declaration "sharply condemns unprovoked Russian aggression on sovereignty, territorial integrity and independence of Ukraine". The only MP which abstained from voting in favour was Katarina Peović of Workers' Front, claiming that this declaration "militarizes Croatian society". Croatian parliamentarian Domagoj Hajduković also expressed his support for Ukraine by protesting in front of Russian Embassy in Zagreb on 25 May 2022.

Krešo Beljak of Croatian Peasant Party, considers that "both Russia and USA run the imperialist war in Ukraine at the expense of poor Ukrainians". He also criticized Zelensky for "only asking for weapons, not humanitarian aid", or a "ceasefire". In one of his speeches in Croatian parlament he also said that: " in Ukraine, USA is waging a war against Russia up until a final Ukrainian" [is alive].  

President of Croatia Zoran Milanović expressed mostly (according to conclusions made by journalists and political analysts) opinions which favoured Russia, although he himself was saying that he is: "neither Ukrainian enemy, nor Russian friend". Milanović was commended in Russian media because of his statements, while at the same time he ended on a black list of Ukrainian extremist website Myrotvorets. Milanović even provoked a furious reaction from the Ukrainian Ministry of Foreign Affairs, which summoned the Croatian ambassador in Kyiv on consultations due to Milanović's statements. Prime Minister Plenković apologised to Ukrainians for Milanović's statements. When Politico wrote about posibility of Ukrainian troops being trained in EU including in Croatia, Milanović was first to rise up against it. He said that he will block any initiative of Ukrainians receiving their training in Croatia. In a response to that, Milanović again became a "star" of Russian media, with Russian state-owned news agency TASS for example quoting Milanović's statement that "NATO is a warring party in Ukraine".

Retired admiral Davor Domazet Lošo expressed opinions aligned with the Russian interpretation of the war, claiming that the war in Ukraine is a clash between "Christ and Antichrist" where Collective west plays the role of an Antichrist". This will surely make Putin a winner, claimed Domazet. He also stated that, "The Ukrainian language is a dialect of the Russian language" and that "Kyiv never was a Ukrainian city". Pro-Russian opinions on the war were also expressed by former members of populist, Eurosceptic former political party Živi zid. Former member of this party Ivan Vilibor Sinčić complained against Croatian government's decision to grant 3500 HRK of financial aid to Ukrainian refugees. Former Živi zid member Braninir Bunjac also expressed his support to Russia on social networks. Ivan Pernar was one of the largest supporters of Russian invasion of Ukraine, and he used his Telegram channel to spread Russian propaganda.

Diplomatic reactions from Moscow 

 On 16 March 2022, Yuri Pilipson, a deputy of the Russian Ministry of Foreign Affairs in charge of south-eastern Europe, criticized Croatia and Slovenia for providing military aid to Ukraine.
 After Croatia expelled 11 Russian diplomats and 6 members of administration, Russia responded by expelling 5 diplomats from the Croatian embassy in Moscow.
 On 25 April 2022, Russian Ministry of Foreign Affairs spokesperson Maria Zakharova verbally attacked Croatia for denying the right to Russian diplomats to leave Croatia via airplane. Zakharova stated that Croatia, "systematically and intentionally develops an anti-Russian line and [..] downgrades itself to the level of conspiring".
 On 22 July 2022, the Kremlin announced that Croatia was added to the "List of enemy countries of Russia", along with Greece, Denmark, Slovakia and Slovenia.

Following illegal Russian referendums and annexations of four Ukrainian oblasts, partially occupied by Russian Army, Andrej Nestorenko, a Russian ambassador in Croatia was summoned to Ministry of Foreign and European Affairs in Zagreb. While there, he was expressed official protest due to illegal annexation and threats of using nuclear weapons. Croatia demanded abolishment of the annexation and withdrawal of Russian army and military equipment from entire territory of Ukraine.

Zagreb Crimean Platform Summit 

In October 2022, Croatian capital Zagreb hosted 1st Parliamentary Summit of the International Crimea Platform. The summit was attended by representatives of 32 states, while 11 more participated in the summit via videolink. Croatian president Zoran Milanović did not attend the summit, and apparently even refused to meet with Nancy Pelosi, for which he was again hailed in Russian media. 

Two days after the summit, Chairman of Verkhovna Rada, Ruslan Stefanchuk, held a speech in Croatian Sabor, in which he compared Ukrainian struggle during Russian invasion of Ukraine, with Croatian struggle in Croatian War of Independence. After his speech, Ukrainian folklore ansamble held a performance in Sabor.

Social influence 

According to the poll conducted in March 2022 on behalf of Croatian RTL television, 58.1% of Croatian citizens consider Russia and its president Putin responsible for 2022 Invasion of Ukraine. 26.3% of Croatian citizens consider both Russia and US equally responsible for this war. 5.8% of Croatian citizens considers United States solely responsible for war in Ukraine. Remaining citizens (8.8%) considers Ukraine, United States, NATO, or European Union in some combination to be responsible for the war. Another poll conducted on 15 March 2022, showed similar results.

At the beginning of Russian invasion, protests against the invasion and in support of Ukraine were held in several Croatian cities. On 5 March 2022, a protest in support of Ukraine was held in Zagreb. According to Croatian daily Jutarnji list, the protest was attended by several thousand of Zagreb citizens. Notable people attending the protest included Croatian education minister Radovan Fuchs, president of the Croatian Helsinki Committee Ivan Zvonimir Čičak, European parliamentarian Tonino Picula, and French ambassador in Croatia Gaël Veyssière. Similar protest in support of Ukraine was also organised in second largest Croatian town Split. Town mayor Ivica Puljak and county prefect Blaženko Boban also participated in the protest. More protest in support of Ukraine were held in Vukovar and Slavonski Brod. In Slavonski Brod some young woman attacked the protesters by yelling: "What does [Slavonski] Brod have from Ukraine!?", before she was taken away by the police. Another protest in support of Ukraine was also held in front of Faculty of Humanities and Social Sciences in Zagreb on 5 April 2022.

During the Battle of Mariupol, Russians captured Croatian citizen Vjekoslav Prebeg who was a member of Ukrainian Marines. He ended up on separatist Donetsk People's Republic court, along with Brits and Swedes who were also captured. The separatist court accused them of being foreign mercenaries. On 21 September 2022, Prebeg and remaining captives were released from the Russian captivity through Saudi Arabian mediation. In June 2022 yet another Croatian citizen returned to Croatia after he was badly wounded while fighting for Ukrainians near Kharkiv.

On 16 September 2022, Croatian 29-year-old humanitarian Andro Fabijanić was killed in Ukraine by the anti-tank mine blast. Croatian media published that until 21 June 2022, Republic of Croatia had housed 20,005 Ukrainian refugees.

Military influence 

On 10 March 2022, a unmanned aerial vehicle of unknown origin crashed in Zagreb, which most likely flew all the way from Ukraine. In early March 2022, Croatian media published that Croatia is sending military aid to Ukraine worth 16.5 million Euros. The aid in form of protective gear and small arms dispatched to Ukraine was apparently sufficient to equip four infantry brigades. On 4 March 2022, the Croatian military attaché in Moscow Željko Akrap was summoned to Russian Defence Ministry where Russians attempted to hand him a protest note, claiming that Croatian citizen Denis Šeler "brought 200 foreign mercenaries from Croatia" to fight for Ukraine. Akrap refused to take this note. Denis Šeler, whom the Russians have accused, on the same day gave the statement to Croatian media denying the Russian accusations and saying that: "this clearly shows that Russians are desperate".

On 15 August 2022, news site Shepard Media wrote that Croatia donated at least fifteen M-46 field guns to Ukraine. On 20 September 2022, photographs of these guns taken in the Donbas appeared on Twitter, as well as ammunition crates with markings on Croatian language.

Economic influence 
Due to economic sanctions imposed on Russia, the Russian Sberbank ceased its operations in Croatia. Its Croatian subsidiary was taken over by Croatian state-owned Hrvatska poštanska banka, and rebranded it as Nova hrvatska banka. Due to Russian invasion, Croatia faced many price increases. According to Croatian newspapers Poslovni dnevnik, which deals with economic topics, in March 2022, food prices in Croatia reached a record high over the previous 30 years. In early October 2022, Croatia stopped supplying Serbia with Russian crude oil through its Adriatic Pipeline. Although this decision was made on the level of the European Union, Aleksandar Vučić's government in Belgrade blamed Croatia for termination of supply after which people and media close to President Vučić publicly insulted Croatia and its institutions for the next few days by comparing them to the historical far-right Ustaše movement.

Cultural influence 

 Croatian submission to 2023 Eurovision Song Contest by band Let 3 called Mama ŠČ is interpreted by some as critique of 2022 Russian invasion of Ukraine.

References 

Croatia–Russia relations
Croatia–Ukraine relations